The 2021 Tennessee State Tigers football team represented Tennessee State University during the 2021 NCAA Division I FCS football season as a member of the Ohio Valley Conference (OVC). They were led by first-year head coach Eddie George and played their games at Nissan Stadium in Nashville, Tennessee.

Previous season 

The Tigers finished the 2020 season with a 2–5 record, 2–5 in OVC play to finish tied for sixth place in the conference. On the day of their final game of the season, it was announced that Tennessee State was not expected to renew the contract of their head coach Rod Reed, and that he would be replaced with former Tennessee Titans star and Heisman Trophy winner Eddie George. The university officially announced that Reed would not return the next day on April 12, 2021, and announced the hiring of George on April 13. It was revealed by The Tennessean that George's deal was a five-year deal with an annual salary of US$400,000.

Schedule

Source:

Game summaries

at Grambling State

vs. Jackson State

Coaching staff

References

Tennessee State
Tennessee State Tigers football seasons
Tennessee State Tigers football